WHYP-LP is an Active Rock and Alternative Rock formatted broadcast radio station.  The station is licensed to Corry and serving Corry, Union City, Elgin, and Spartansburg in Pennsylvania.  WHYP-LP is owned and operated by Corry Area Radio Service.

References

External links
 Channel 98-9 FM Online
 

2017 establishments in Pennsylvania
Active rock radio stations in the United States
Alternative rock radio stations in the United States
Radio stations established in 2017
HYP-LP
HYP-LP